In the mathematical discipline known as group theory, the phrase Suzuki group refers to:
The Suzuki sporadic group, Suz or Sz is a sporadic simple group of order 213 · 37 · 52 · 7 · 11 · 13 = 448,345,497,600 discovered by Suzuki in 1969
One of an infinite family of Suzuki groups of Lie type discovered by Suzuki

Group theory